Ron Paul has unsuccessfully run for president three times; it may refer to:
Ron Paul presidential campaign, 1988
Ron Paul presidential campaign, 2008
Ron Paul presidential campaign, 2012